Handball at the 2014 Asian Games was held in Incheon, South Korea from September 20 to  October 2, 2014. In this tournament, 14 teams played in the men's competition, and 9 teams participated in the women's competition.

Schedule

Medalists

Medal table

Draw
A draw ceremony was held on 21 August 2014 to determine the groups for the men's and women's competitions. The teams were seeded based on their final ranking at the 2010 Asian Games. South Korean teams were not seeded as they could choose their groups.

Men

Group A
 (4)
 (6)

Group B
 (2)
 (8)

Group C
 (5)
 (7)

Group D
 (3)
 (9)
 (Host)

Women

Group A
 (1)
 (7)

 (Host)

Group B
 (2)
 (4)

Final standing

Men

Women

References

External links
Official website

 
2014 Asian Games events
2014
Asian Games
2014 Asian Games